The Amaggi Group, Portuguese Grupo Amaggi, is a large Brazilian commodities company involved in the soybean industry.  It is the largest private producer of soybeans in the world. The company has annual sales of over $500 million, and is a large domestically owned exporter that exports to destinations in both Europe and the United States. 

Amaggi was founded in 1977 by André Maggi of Italian origin as a seed producer. In the 1980s, he acquired large tracts of land in Mato Grosso and went into soybean production. There he also had the city of Sapezal built. After his death in 2001, his son Blairo Maggi took over the company. It is headed by CEO Blairo Maggi, son of the group founder Andre Maggi. He is a former Brazilian Minister of Agriculture, Livestock, and Supply who is linked to the destruction of the Amazon Rainforest.

References

External links
 André Maggi Group homepage

Agriculture companies of Brazil
Trading companies of Brazil
Soybean industry
Trading companies established in the 20th century